Bindu Kumar Thapa is a Nepali politician of Nepali Congress and served as a minister in Gandaki government from 23 July 2021 to December 2022.

References 

Nepali Congress politicians from Gandaki Province
Year of birth missing (living people)
Living people
Prithvi Narayan Campus alumni
Provincial cabinet ministers of Nepal
Members of the Provincial Assembly of Gandaki Province